was a Japanese baseball player who played as an outfielder.

Born in Toyonaka, Osaka, he played for the Yomiuri Giants (1956–1964) and the Toei Flyers (1965–1967).

After he retired from baseball, he took over the electric construction family business, and was also a member of the "Japan Baseball Promotion Association".

He died on January 28, 2014, from stomach cancer.

References

External links 
 Kazuhiko Sakazaki at Baseball Reference.com

1938 births
2014 deaths
People from Toyonaka, Osaka
Japanese baseball players
Yomiuri Giants players
Toei Flyers players
Japanese businesspeople
Baseball people from Osaka Prefecture